This article lists all netballers who have played Suncorp Super Netball games for the Sunshine Coast Lightning.

NOTES:
 Debut: Players are listed in order of player cap number as designated by the club and as featured on player's netball dress. Foundation players received their numbers in the order in which they signed with the club.
 Appearances: 
 Super Netball games for Sunshine Coast Lightning only. This not a total of their career games and does not include games for other clubs or in other competitions. E.g. Caitlin Bassett has played a career total of 56 Super Netball games in Australia, but of those 33 were at Sunshine Coast. 
 Unused reserve players do not gain an appearance for games in which they did not take to the court.
 Previous Club: refers to the previous netball club (Super Netball, overseas, or previous Australia/NZ elite level netball competitions) the player played at, and does not refer to any junior club she was signed to but never played at.
 Premierships: Indicates player was part of the Lightning match day squad that won a Super Netball Grand Final.
 Players in bold are contracted to the Lightning for 2022
 The statistics in this table are current as the end of round one of the 2023 Suncorp Super Netball season.

List of all time players

2023 squad

Notes

References

   
Lists of Suncorp Super Netball players